No. 8 "Light Transport" Squadron is a squadron of the Sri Lanka Air Force. It currently operates the Beechcraft B-200, Harbin Y-12 and Xian MA60 from SLAF Ratmalana. Its roles include light transport, reconnaissance and advanced fixed-wing flying training of officer cadets for twin engine aircraft.

History
On 2 April 1996 the No. 2 Squadron aircraft was divided between the No. 201 and No. 202 squadrons. The No. 201 was later renamed the No. 2 Heavy Transport Squadron and the No. 202 squadron was renamed the No. 8 Light Transport Squadron and operated the lighter aircraft of the air force.

Aircraft operated
Year of introduction
 Harbin Y-12 - 1985
 Beechcraft 200 - 1985
 Xian MA60

Notable members

References 

 https://web.archive.org/web/20090208195001/http://www.airforce.lk/hist/hist1/h3c6p1.htm

External links 
 Sri Lanka Air Force Base Ratmalana
 scramble.nl

Military units and formations established in 1994
8